Gmelina is a genus of plants in the family Lamiaceae. It consists of about 35 species in Australia, New Guinea, New Caledonia, Southeast Asia, India and a few in Africa. Some species such as G. arborea have been planted and/or become naturalised in India, Africa and Australia. It was named by Carl Linnaeus in honour of botanist Johann Georg Gmelin.

Species
This listing draws from de Kok's 2012 revision of this genus, and additional sources including IPNI, APNI and the Flora of China.

 Gmelina arborea  – India, Bangladesh, Pakistan, Sri Lanka, Burma, Thailand, Vietnam, S. China, (mainland southeast Asia region)
 Gmelina asiatica  – India, Sri Lanka, Burma, China, Thailand, Vietnam, (southeast Asia)
 Gmelina australis  – Northern Territory, Australia
 Gmelina basifilum  – New Guinea, New Britain
 Gmelina chinensis   – S. China, Laos, Vietnam
 Gmelina dalrympleana  – Wet tropics & Cape York, Australia, New Guinea
 Gmelina delavayana  – Sichuan & Yunnan, China endemic
 Gmelina elliptica  – India, Burma, S. China, Vietnam, Thailand, Malaysia, Singapore, Philippines, Indonesia, (SE. Asia)
 Gmelina evoluta  – New Caledonia
 Gmelina fasciculiflora , Northern white beech – Wet Tropics Australia
 Gmelina hainanensis  – S. China, Vietnam
 Gmelina hollrungii  – Moluccas, New Guinea, NT, N. Qld & WA, Solomon Is.
 Gmelina lecomtei  – Yunnan, Kwantung, Hainan, China, Laos, Vietnam
 Gmelina ledermannii  – New Guinea
 Gmelina leichhardtii  , White beech – eastern NSW & QLD, Australia
 Gmelina lepidota  – Moluccas, New Guinea, New Britain
 Gmelina lignum-vitreum  – endangered New Caledonia endemic
 Gmelina magnifica  – New Caledonia
 Gmelina moluccana  – Moluccas, New Guinea, Solomon Is.
 Gmelina neocaledonica  – New Caledonia
 Gmelina palawensis 
 subsp. celebica  – Sulawesi
 subsp. palawensis – Palau Is.
 Gmelina papuana  – New Guinea
 Gmelina peltata  – Solomon Is.
 Gmelina philippensis  – Philippines, Cambodia, Vietnam, Thailand
 Gmelina racemosa ; syn.: G. hainanensis  – Hainan Island & southern China, Vietnam
 Gmelina salomonensis  – Solomon Is. endemic
 Gmelina schlechteri  – New Guinea
 Gmelina sessilis  – New Guinea, New Britain
 Gmelina smithii  – New Guinea
 Gmelina szechwanensis  – Sichuan China, de Kok did not see the type specimen but considers this within G. philippinensis
 Gmelina tholicola  – New Caledonia
 Gmelina uniflora  – Borneo endemic
 Gmelina vitiensis  – Fiji endemic

References

Cited works

Gallery

 
Taxa named by Carl Linnaeus
Taxonomy articles created by Polbot
Lamiaceae genera